Noor Mohammed Charlie (，1911-1983), popularly known as Charlie, was a Pakistani actor born on 1 July 1911 in Ranavav village, Porbandar, Saurashtra, British India. Best known for his comedy roles, he was the first 'star' comedian and has been referred to as India's first comedy king. He acted with several top actresses of those days as a comic hero. Being a great fan of Charlie Chaplin, he took the name "Charlie" as his screen name following the release of his popular film The Indian Charlie (1933). He had a successful career in pre-partition India from 1925–1946. His shift to Pakistan following partition saw his career going down with less than 12 films. He shifted to the US to live with his son and returned later to Pakistan where he died in 1983.

Early years
Noor Mohammed was born into a Memon family. Hating school as a young boy, Noor Mohammed often played truant to visit cinema theatres. At an early age he started working at repairing broken umbrellas. In 1925 he was employed by the Imperial Film Company at Rs. 40 a month when he walked boldly in announcing that he could sing.

Career
Charlie made his debut in Krishna Film Company's Akalna Bardan (1928) directed by Prafulla Ghosh. At this time he was billed as Noor Mohammed and did other films like Lekh Par Mekh and Vasant Leela. In 1929 he was signed up by Elfin Film Company for The Indian Charlie which was however not released till 1933. His Ezra Mir directed film Zarina in 1932 with the advent of Talkies made him a popular actor. He acted under Ezra Mir in one more film Premi Pagal (1933) and with Sarvottam Badami in Chandrahasa (1933). These films made him very popular with the audience. Finally, in 1933 The Indian Charlie was released which "became such a huge sensation", catapulting him to stardom. The success of the film was the reason for the change of name to Noor Mohammed "Charlie", and in later films as just "Charlie".

In 1934, Charlie joined Ranjit Film Company acting in successful films like Toofani Taruni (1934), Toofan Mail (1934) and Barrister's Wife (1935). He often co-starred with other famous comedians like Dixit and Ghory. The 1940s saw him acting in several hit films. Musafir (1940), directed by Chaturbhuj Doshi, in which Charlie played a foreign-returned prince who on his return finds his kingdom in a mess, became very popular. Other films of this time include Dhandora (1941), which he directed, A. R. Kardar's Pagal (1941), Jayant Desai's Bansari (1943), Mehboob Khan's Taqdeer (1943), Jayant Desai's Manorama (1944), Mahesh Chandra's Chand Tara (1945), Zia Sarhadi's Yateem (1945) and Phani Majumdar's Insaaf (1946). He starred with top actresses like Swarnalata, Mehtab and Leela Chitnis. He sang with artists like Suraiya and Amirbai Karnataki. At the height of his success he charged more than Prithviraj Kapoor and other top stars of that time.

Career in Pakistan
Following the Partition of India in 1947, Charlie opted to live in Pakistan. His first film in Pakistan was the Daud Chand directed Mundri (1949) in Punjabi. He then did Nazeer Ajmeri's Beqarar (1950), both films were well appreciated. Though he went on to act in about a dozen Urdu, Sindhi and Punjabi films in Pakistan, not all were successful. He came back to India in 1960 and acted in three films; Zameen Ke Taare (1960), Zamana Badal Gaya (1961) and Akeli Mat Jaiyo (1963). According to Sanjit Narwekar in his book Eena Meena Deeka: The Story of Hindi Film Comedy, the Indian Government at that time refused Charlie citizenship and he had to return to Pakistan. After acting in a few more Lollywood films, Charlie went to US to join his son.

Family and death
Noor Mohammed Charlie had six sons and six daughters. He returned to Pakistan from US and died on 30 June 1983 in Karachi, Sindh, Pakistan. His one son was a renowned film and TV actor, Latif Charlie, who died on 19 July 2011 at the age of 75. Noor Mohammed's grandson (Latif Charlie's Son) is Yawar Charlie, who was a former actor having acted in TV episodes of JAG and General Hospital and now specialises in West Hollywood CA Homes and Property Listings. His gay wedding made headlines in South Asia  Another grandson, through Latif Charlie, is RJ Dino Ali.
his other grandson through another son, Noorarash Charlie, is a designer/theater actor based in Tehran.

Influences
Chandulal Shah, the owner of Ranjit Film Company stated in one of his interviews that Charlie "ruled the roost" among comedians. According to film historian Harish Raghuvanshi as quoted in Times of India, "Noor Mohammed developed a style of comedy of his own, which influenced great comedians like Johnny Walker and Mehmood." Abrar Alvi mentions that Johnny Walker was a "great admirer" of Charlie and copied his body style and "mannerisms".

He was the first comedian to have songs picturised on him. His "Palat Tera Dhyan Kidhar Hai", under the music direction of Naushad and with lyrics by Arshad Gujarati remains popular with copies in later films. His other popular song was "Zindagi Hai Fareb Fareb Se Nibhaaye Jaa" from Chand Tara (1945). This trend of a singing comedian was later picked up by Johnny Walker and Mehmood. His film Barrister's Wife (1935) had the first filmi qawwali picturised on him to appear in Indian Cinema, "Nazariya Taane Hai Teer Kaman", composed by Rewashankar, and "Banne Khan", with lyrics by Pandit Narayan Prasad Betaab.

Filmography

India

Pakistan

References

External links

Palat Tera Dhyan Kidhar Hai YouTube

1911 births
1983 deaths
Male actors in Hindi cinema
Pakistani male film actors
Male actors in Urdu cinema
Male actors in Sindhi cinema
20th-century Pakistani male actors
Memon people